The R465 road, also called the Broadford Road, is a regional road in Ireland, located in County Clare.

References

Regional roads in the Republic of Ireland
Roads in County Clare